Against the Law is a 1997 American action crime directed by Jim Wynorski and starring Nick Mancuso, Nancy Allen and Richard Grieco.

Plot
In California, a homeless and mentally ill man, Rex, comes to believe he is a gunfighter from the American Old West, and heads for Los Angeles. While travelling, he begins a murder spree, and his victims include police officers. He becomes fixated on Los Angeles police officer John Shepard, who is in the news after killing a drug dealer in a shootout, and news anchor Maggie Hewitt, who broke the story. He terrorizes Hewitt before arriving in Los Angeles, where he challenges Shepard to a Western-style showdown at high noon.

Cast

Nancy Allen as  Maggie Hewitt 
Richard Grieco as  Rex 
Nick Mancuso as  Det. John Shepard 
Steven Ford as  Lt. Bill Carpenter 
Thomas Mikal Ford as  Det. Siegel 
Gary Sandy as  Chief Leitner 
Leslie Bega as  Lucia
James Stephens as  Det. Ben Hamada 
Herb Mitchell as  Carl Stensgard 
Heather Thomas as  Felicity 
Jaime Pressly as  Sally
B.K. Byron as  Lars Reder 
Tim Colceri as  Officer I.Q. 
Randy Crowder as  Lt. Fuller 
Billy Gallo as  DJ 
Randy Hall as  Security Guard 
Frank Lloyd as  Officer Caultman

Production
The film was written by Steve Mitchell with Bob Sheridan. Mitchell hoped to direct and wrote it with John Terlesky in mind for the lead. Jim Wynorski bought the script for Sunset Films, a company he was operating with Andrew Stevens for Cinetel Films. Mitchell said he thought the film "ultimately turned out to be one of Jim’s best movies, but there are a lot of things I’m not happy with. The casting was a lot of it."

References

External links

American crime action films
Films shot in Los Angeles
1997 films
1990s crime action films
1990s exploitation films
Films directed by Jim Wynorski
Films scored by Kevin Kiner
Films about journalists
1990s English-language films
1990s American films